David George Bell (26 June 1890 – 20 September 1961) was an Australian rules footballer who played with Melbourne in the Victorian Football League (VFL).

Notes

External links 

1890 births
Australian rules footballers from Victoria (Australia)
Melbourne Football Club players
1961 deaths